Murder In Amityville is a book written by Hans Holzer and serves as a prequel to The Amityville Horror.
The book has been turned into a film titled Amityville II: The Possession. It has since been re-released under the title Amityville: Fact or Fiction?

Plot summary 
The plot tries to explain why Ronald Defeo Jr. killed his family at 112 Ocean Ave. It revolves around Ronald Jr. as he experiences strange events in the house up until he kills his entire family on November 13, 1974. It goes on to explain that he was possessed and that he did not want to kill his family. It introduces controversial events. It is also based on Defeo's explanation of why he says he killed his family.

Films
The book was the basis for two prequels to 1979's The Amityville Horror: 1982's Amityville II: The Possession and 2018's The Amityville Murders. The name of the family was changed and the family's stay itself was shortened. While the prior is not a faithful prequel, it takes some details from Murder in Amityville. The latter film served as a direct prequel to the 1979 film, ignoring Amityville II and using the book. The remake of The Amityville Horror also uses Holzer's theory. DeFeo was possessed, but in the remake DeFeo is possessed by a fictionalized version of John Ketcham. In the remake the house is built on a Native American burial ground. A television special was filmed in 1979 with Holzer narrating and including interviews with DeFeo and medium Ethel Johnson-Meyers, but eventually was scrapped and never made public.

The Amityville Horror
1979 American novels
American novels adapted into films
American horror novels